Mediterranean Holiday is a 1962 West German documentary film directed by Hermann Leitner and Rudolf Nussgruber. It was entered into the 3rd Moscow International Film Festival.

It was filmed in Superpanorama 70, a 70mm non-anamorphic format, marketed as Cinevision when presented on a curved screen. It was reprinted anamorphically in 35mm and often advertised as a CinemaScope release. It was even shown in a Cinerama theatres, where it was advertised as a Cinerama release.

Cast
 Burl Ives as narrator (English-language version)
 Hans Clarin as narrator (German-language version)
 Graham Hill as himself
 Grace Kelly as herself (as Princess Grace of Monaco)
 Begum Aga Khan III as herself (as Die Begum)
 King Constantine II as himself (as Prince Constantine of Greece)
 Prince Rainier of Monaco as himself

References

External links
 

1962 films
1962 documentary films
German documentary films
West German films
1960s German-language films
Films directed by Karl Hartl
Films set in the Mediterranean Sea
Seafaring films
1960s German films